Mission: Control! is the debut album by American rock band Burning Airlines.  It was released in 1999. The German label Arctic Rodeo Recordings reissued the album as a colored vinyl LP with enclosed CD in an edition of 700 copies (200 on yellow, 250 on blue, 250 on marbled orange/red) in 2012 with an extra song: "Back of Love."

Track listing
All songs written by Burning Airlines, lyrics by J. Robbins.

 "Carnival" – 2:30
 "Wheaton Calling" – 3:12
 "Pacific 231" – 3:20
 "Scissoring" – 2:32
 "The Escape Engine" – 2:54
 "(my pornograph)" – 1:13
 "Meccano" – 2:51
 "3 Sisters" – 5:47
 "Flood of Foreign Capital" – 3:44
 "Crowned" – 2:43
 "Sweet Deals on Surgery" – 2:39
 "I Sold Myself In" – 9:26 (original CD release; actual song 2:50, followed by 4:55 of silence and a 1:41 untitled bonus song); 3:02 (2012 reissue)
 "Untitled" - 1:43 (2012 reissue)
 "Back of Love" - 3:12 (2012 reissue)

Personnel
J. Robbins – vocals, guitars, mini-moog, percussion, devices
Bill Barbot – bass guitar, vocals, keyboards, guitar, percussion
Peter Moffett – drums, vocals, percussion, guitar

References

1999 debut albums
Burning Airlines albums